Hanne Nørregaard  (born 21 December 1968) is a Danish women's international footballer who plays as a midfielder. She is a member of the Denmark women's national football team. She was part of the team at the 1999 FIFA Women's World Cup.

References

1968 births
Living people
Danish women's footballers
Denmark women's international footballers
Place of birth missing (living people)
1999 FIFA Women's World Cup players
Women's association football midfielders